Alice Brown may refer to:

Alice Brown (sprinter) (born 1960), American sprinter
Alice Brown (ombudsman) (born 1946), Scottish academic
Alice Brown (politician), Canadian politician
Alice Brown (writer) (1857–1948), American novelist, poet and playwright
Alice E. Brown (1912–1973), Alaskan Kenaitze tribal member, indigenous rights activist
Alice Dalton Brown (born 1939), American realist painter
Alice Van Vechten Brown (1862–1949), American art historian

See also
Alice Brown Davis (1852–1935), Native American chief of the Seminole Tribe of Oklahoma